Homrighausen is a family name that originated in the area of Berleburg in what is now the district of Siegen-Wittgenstein in Germany.

The village of Homrighausen was never more than a small hamlet north and slightly west of the town of Berleburg. Its first documented mention was in 1502 as Homerchusen. However, the settlement is probably much older than that. Scholarly opinion is that place names ending in -hausen in Wittgenstein originated in the period 950-1150.
"-hausen" simply meant a settlement of houses, and it is believed that "Homrig" emerged from the words for a high hill--hohen Berg in German.

In 1606, Graf Georg relocated the peasant families living at Homrighausen to other villages to have full use of the land. An impressive forest house was erected there around 1770. It is now part of the city of Bad Berleburg

The family name of Homrighausen is found in several nearby villages by the 16th century, but no one has been able to link these early branches back to a common ancestor. Besides the town of Berleburg itself, the Homrighausen name was and is common in the villages of Wunderthausen, Diedenshausen, Wemlighausen and Girkhausen, among others. At present, around 300 families by this name live in Germany, and more than half are in Siegen-Wittgenstein. A similar number live in the United States.

Homrighausens from Wittgenstein – as well as some a generation or two removed – came to America at various times beginning as early as 1748  Important points of settlement during the 19th century included Wheatland, Iowa, and Paola, Kansas. In the case of the earlier settlers, the name was often modified. "Hummerickhouse" is an example.

One prominent American with this name was the Rev. Dr. Elmer G. Homrighausen (1900–1982), a theologian and professor at the Princeton seminary.
     
Another American Homrighausen was the Rev. Dr. Edgar William Homrighausen (1924-2017).  This theologian, parish pastor and President of the Southern District of Lutheran Church Missouri Synod from 1957-1969, led his District (Alabama, Mississippi, Louisiana and the Panhandle of Florida) through the Civil Rights Movement of the 1960s.

Genealogy
More than 50 Homrighausens are known to have emigrated directly from Wunderthausen or Diedenshausen to the United States. There were certainly others.

Principal Sources:

 Wunderthausen: Mehr als 700 Jahre bewegter Geschichte. 2006, Wunderthausen
 800 Jahre Diedenshausen: Geschichte des Dorfes und seiner Familien Diedenshausen, 1997
 . Paul Riedesel.

Notes 

German-language surnames